William Slavens McNutt (September 12, 1885 – January 25, 1938), was an American screenwriter. He wrote for 28 films between 1922 and 1939. He was nominated for an Academy Award on two occasions. At the 5th Academy Awards, he was nominated for the Academy Award for Best Story for Lady and Gent. In 1936, he was nominated for Adapted Screenplay for the film The Lives of a Bengal Lancer. He was born in Urbana, Illinois and died in San Fernando, California.

Selected filmography
 The Wise Kid (1922)
 Tom Sawyer (1930)
Dangerous Paradise (1930)
Derelict (1930)
 Huckleberry Finn (1931)
 Lady and Gent (1932)
 The Lives of a Bengal Lancer (1935)

Bibliography

 There Were Giants, a Story of Blood and Steel  (A novel with Grover Jones; M.S. Mill, N.Y. (1939))

References

External links

1885 births
1938 deaths
American male screenwriters
The New Yorker people
20th-century American male writers
20th-century American screenwriters